André Österholm (born 17 June 1996) is a Swedish footballer who plays for Östersund. Besides Sweden, he has played in Spain and Finland.

Club career
On 9 February 2022, Österholm signed a two-year contract with Östersund.

References

1996 births
Footballers from Stockholm
Living people
Swedish footballers
Association football midfielders
AFC Eskilstuna players
Huddinge IF players
Coruxo FC players
CF Villanovense players
IK Sirius Fotboll players
Ekenäs IF players
Östersunds FK players
Ettan Fotboll players
Superettan players
Segunda División B players
Tercera División players
Allsvenskan players
Ykkönen players
Swedish expatriate footballers
Expatriate footballers in Spain
Swedish expatriate sportspeople in Spain
Expatriate footballers in Finland
Swedish expatriate sportspeople in Finland